The Argentina women's national under-21 field hockey team represents Argentina in women's international under-21 field hockey competitions and is controlled by the Argentine Hockey Confederation, the governing body for field hockey in Argentina.

The team competes in the Pan American Junior Championship which they have won a record seven times. They have qualified for all Junior World Cups which they have won twice.

Tournament record

Current squad
These players have been announced on 4 March 2022 to compete in the 2021 Junior World Cup from 1st to 12 April in Potchefstroom, South Africa.

Head Coach: Fernando Ferrara

Recent call-ups
These players were called-up in the last 12 months.

Test Matches

2021 Junior Pan American Championship

2021 Junior World Cup

Records in competitions

There are no records of the squads for the Junior World Cup since its first edition until 2005 edition. Argentina participated in all the editions of the competition.

Youth team

Tournament records

Youth squad
The following players were listed on the roster for the 2022 events:

Head Coach: Juan Martín López.

Results

Youth Pan American Championship

Youth Olympic Games

Hockey 5 competitions

See also
Argentina men's national under-21 field hockey team
Argentina women's national field hockey team

References

Under-21
Women's national under-21 field hockey teams